The 2005 Detroit Tigers season was the team's 105th season and its 6th at Comerica Park.  It involved the Detroit Tigers finishing fourth in the AL Central with a 71-91 record, 28 games in back of the World Series Champion Chicago White Sox.

Offseason
October 15, 2004: DeWayne Wise was selected off waivers by the Detroit Tigers from the Atlanta Braves.
February 7, 2005: Magglio Ordóñez was signed as a free agent with the Detroit Tigers.
February 7, 2005: DeWayne Wise was released by the Detroit Tigers.
February 28, 2005: DeWayne Wise was signed as a free agent with the Detroit Tigers.

Regular season

Season standings

Record vs. opponents

Transactions
June 8, 2005: Ugueth Urbina was traded by the Detroit Tigers with Ramón Martínez to the Philadelphia Phillies for Plácido Polanco.

Roster

Player stats

Batting

Starters by position 
Note: Pos = Position; G = Games played; AB = At bats; H = Hits; Avg. = Batting average; HR = Home runs; RBI = Runs batted in

Other batters
Note: G = Games played; AB = At bats; H = Hits; Avg. = Batting average; HR = Home runs; RBI = Runs batted in

Pitching

Starting and other pitchers 
Note: G = Games pitched; IP = Innings pitched; W = Wins; L = Losses; ERA = Earned run average; SO = Strikeouts

Relief pitchers 
Note: G = Games pitched; W = Wins; L = Losses; SV = Saves; ERA = Earned run average; SO = Strikeouts

Farm system

LEAGUE CHAMPIONS: Toledo

Notes

References

2005 Detroit Tigers season at Baseball Reference

Detroit Tigers seasons
Detroit Tigers season
Detroit
2005 in Detroit